Emily Warren (born 1992)  is an American singer.

Emily Warren may also refer to:

 Emily Warren (artist) (1869–1956), artist and illustrator
 Emily Warren (courtesan) (died 1780s), English courtesan
 Emily Warren Roebling (1843–1903), helped complete the Brooklyn Bridge when her husband, Chief Engineer Washington Roebling, fell ill
 Emily Warren (scientist), American physicist